Arthur Herbert Cass (19 July 1828 - January 1905) was a British Army officer of the 10th Royal Hussars who fought in the Battle of Chernaya during the Crimean War, winning the medal and clasp.

Early life and family
Cass was born at Beaulieu Lodge, Winchmore Hill, Edmonton, on 19 July 1828. He was baptised at Edmonton on 18 December 1828. His father was Frederick Cass of Beaulieu Lodge and later Little Grove, East Barnet, where he died on 17 May 1861. His mother was Martha Potter of Ponder's End. She died at Chester Terrace, Regent's Park, on 5 July 1870. His siblings were the clergyman and local historian Frederick Charles Cass, clergyman Charles William Cass, and Martha Adelina Cass (died Little Grove, 1831).

Cass was educated at Trinity College, University of Cambridge.

Military career
Cass joined the British Army in 1850 serving in the 10th Royal Hussars (as it became). He took part in the capture of Tchorguan and the siege and capture of Sevastopol during the Crimean War. He fought in the Battle of Chernaya in August 1855, winning the medal and clasp.

He was promoted from lieutenant to captain in 1858. He obtained his own troop that year. He was promoted to lieutenant colonel in 1873. He retired as colonel in 1881.

Death
Cass died at the Cavendish Hotel in Eastbourne in January 1905.

References 

Arthur Herbert
People from Winchmore Hill
Royal Hussars officers
Alumni of Trinity College, Cambridge
1828 births
1905 deaths